Up Holland Priory was a Benedictine priory  in Up Holland, Lancashire, England. It was founded in 1319. The priory remains are recorded in the National Heritage List for England as a designated Grade II listed building. and the site is listed as a scheduled monument. The former chancel is now the nave of the Church of St Thomas the Martyr.

See also

Scheduled monuments in Lancashire
Listed buildings in Up Holland
List of English abbeys, priories and friaries serving as parish churches

References
Footnotes

Sources

Monasteries in Lancashire
Buildings and structures in the Borough of West Lancashire
Scheduled monuments in Lancashire
Benedictine monasteries in England
1319 establishments in England
Christian monasteries established in the 14th century
1536 disestablishments in England